Barson Baad is a popular drama serial shown on the PTV  network in 2006. The drama was written by Nasir Jaffri, scripted by the late Salman Wajih Hassan and directed by Syed Faisal Bukhari. The show was filmed in Pakistan and Scotland .

Plot
Barson Baad is a story of two brothers that live in Scotland.

Cast 
 Jawed Sheikh
 Shabbir Jan
 Khayyam Sarhadi
 Ahsan Khan
 Fareeda Shabbir
 Kashif Mehmood
 Narjis Amir
 Hamda Raheel
 Darakshan Tahir
 Rehana Siddiqui
 Eva Majid
 Zaigham Jaffri
Production crew
 Salman Wajih Hassan (screenplay)
 Syed Nasir Jaffri (producer)(writer)
 Syed Faisal Bukhari (director)
 Wajid Ali Nashad (Music)
 waris baig (Singer)
 Mumtaz Khan

References 

Pakistani drama television series
Urdu-language television shows
Pakistan Television Corporation original programming